Sang-mi is a Korean feminine given name. Its meaning differs based on the hanja used to write each syllable of the name. There are 35 hanja with the reading "sang" and 33 hanja with the reading "mi" on the South Korean government's official list of hanja which may be registered for use in given names.

People with this name include:
Chu Sang-mi (born 1973), South Korean actress
An Sang-mi (born 1979), retired South Korean short track speed skater
Sam Oh (Korean name Oh Sang-mi, born 1980), South Korean television host in the Philippines
Nam Sang-mi (born 1984), South Korean actress
Byun Sang-mi (born 1988), South Korean rhythmic gymnast

See also
List of Korean given names

References

Korean feminine given names